Marina Franklin is an American stand-up comedian, actress and podcast host, based in New York City. She is best known for her work on, Single Black Female (comedy special) and Hysterical on FX on Hulu. She also hosts her own podcast Friends Like Us.

Life and career
Franklin was born in Chicago, Illinois. She graduated from the University of Illinois at Urbana–Champaign and Syracuse University. Her film and television credits include Crashing, Trainwreck, The Late Show with Stephen Colbert, The Nightly Show with Larry Wilmore and appeared on Conan O'Brien's tour and worked with him on his shows for Comic-Con in San Diego. She was a staff writer for the HBO comedy series Divorce.

Filmography

Film

Television 

Podcasts and radio
 WTF with Marc Maron
 You Made It Weird with Pete Holmes
 A Prairie Home Companion
 Wait Wait... Don't Tell Me!
 Friends Like Us

References

External links
 
 

Living people
American stand-up comedians
21st-century American comedians
American women comedians
American television actresses
American film actresses
21st-century American actresses
Year of birth missing (living people)